Karimabad Nurali (also Romanized as Karīmābād Nūrʿalī; also known as Karīmābād) is a village in Nurabad Rural District, in the Central District of Delfan County, Lorestan Province, Iran. At the 2006 census, its population was 63, in 15 families.

References 

Towns and villages in Delfan County